Marko Gjorgjievski (born 18 April 2000) is a Macedonian football striker playing with Sileks in Macedonian First League.

Club career
Born in Skopje he played for the youth teams of FK Vardar and SSK Nova. In August 2017 he transferred to second division side FK Borec where he played for their first team, and over the 2 years that he stayed there he scored a total of 24 goals over 43 games that he played. In the summer of 2019, Marko moved to Serbia as a talented Macedonian youth team member, by joining FK Voždovac. Following summer, he moved on loan to Serbian side FK Radnički Pirot.

International career
Marko Gjiorgjievski represented Macedonia at U19 level in 2018. Since 2019 he has been playing for North Macedonia's U21 side.

References

2000 births
Living people
Footballers from Skopje
Association football midfielders
Macedonian footballers
North Macedonia youth international footballers
North Macedonia under-21 international footballers
FK Borec players
FK Voždovac players
Macedonian Second Football League players
Serbian SuperLiga players
FK Radnički Pirot players
Serbian First League players
Macedonian expatriate footballers
Expatriate footballers in Serbia
Macedonian expatriate sportspeople in Serbia